Little Soldier Zhang Ga is a Chinese animated feature film from mainland China.  It is also referred to as "Zhang Ga, The Soldier Boy".  It is adapted from the Chinese children's novel of the same name, by Xu Guangyao 徐光耀, which was based on the true story of Yan Xiufeng.

Background
One film and one TV series with the same name precede the animated version, with more mature contents in 1963 and 2004.  The animation version was a 12 million RMB investment (about US $1.5 million), modified for younger audiences.  The production crew also consist of about 600 people.  This version aims to target audiences of all age groups.

The film was made in a collaboration between "Ai Yi Mei Xun Animation Production Company", an unnamed US-funded Chinese company in association with BTV, and the Youth Film Production Unit at Beijing Film Academy.  The students and faculties from the academy contributed to keep production costs down.  It is the first film created entirely with private investments.  In the cinemas, it was shown due to the 60th anniversary of China's War of Resistance Against Japanese in 2005.

Plot
The story is set in Baiyangdian, in Hebei Province, and is based on the backdrop of the Chinese Civil War and the Second Sino-Japanese War with character Zhang Ga in the middle of the chaos along with the Eighth Route Army.   The real story is based on the actual person Yan Xiufeng, whose childhood name was Gazi, who was born in Baiyangdian.

Translations of the novel
English translation, by Wu Wenyuan: Little soldier Chang Ka-tse

See also
 List of animated feature-length films
 Minjie Chen, The Sino-Japanese War and Youth Literature: Friends and Foes on the Battlefield (Routledge, 2016).

References

External links
 Veteran Story: Yan Xiufeng

2005 films
Chinese animated films
2000s Mandarin-language films